Miami is a 1987 book of social and political analysis by Joan Didion.

Didion begins, "Havana vanities come to dust in Miami." The book is an extended report on the generation of Cubans who landed in exile in Miami following the overthrow of dictator Fulgencio Batista January 1, 1959 and the way in which that community has connected to America and American politics.

Granta writes, "Miami may be the sunniest place in America, but this is Didion's darkest book."

Summary 
Joan Didion describes life in Miami for Cuban exiles. She talks about their position in the history behind major events like the Bay of Pigs invasion, the Reagan Doctrine and Watergate. To Didion, Miami is more than just a city in Florida, rather it is a city of immigrants with stories to be heard.

References

External Links 

 book page on the official website

1987 non-fiction books
Ambassador Book Award-winning works
Books by Joan Didion
Cuban-American culture in Miami